Temax is a town and the municipal seat of the Temax Municipality, Yucatán in Mexico. As of 2010, the town has a population of 6,239.

Demographics

References

Populated places in Yucatán